Josef Molzer (28 February 1906 – September 1987) was an Austrian international footballer and coach.

References

1906 births
1987 deaths
Association football forwards
Austrian footballers
Austria international footballers
Austrian football managers
SK Rapid Wien players
FK Austria Wien players
First Vienna FC players
SK Sturm Graz managers
TSV 1860 Munich managers
Austria national football team managers
First Vienna FC managers
Place of birth missing